A Landfoged () was a civil servant who saw to the finances of the Danish king in islands such as Iceland and the Faroe Islands, collecting revenue for the whole country. The usual English translation is 'sheriff'.

Iceland

The  collected taxes in Gullbringusýsla and was police chief in Reykjavík. He had to make sure the trade legislation would be obeyed. 

These are Iceland's :

 Kristofer Heidemann (1683–1693)
 Andrés Iversen (1693–1695)
 Jens Jörgensen (1695–1702)
 Páll Pétursson Beyer (1702–1717)
 Kornelíus Wulf (1717–1727)
 Kristján Luxdorf (1727–1739)
 Kristján Drese (1739–1749)
 Guðni Sigurðsson (1749)
 Skúli Magnússon (1749–1793)
 Jón Skúlason (deputy ) (1763–1786)
 Hans Jakob Líndal (1786–1787)
 Magnús Stephensen (1793–1794)
 Paul M. Finne (1794–1804)
 Rasmus Frydensberg (1804–1813)
 Sigurður Thorgrímsen (1813–1828)
 Christian Ulstrup (1828–1836)
 Ólafur H. Finsen (1831–1832)
 Þórður Sveinbjörnsson (1835–1836)
 Stefán Gunnlaugsson (1836)
 Morten Hansen Tvede (1836–1838)
 Stefán Gunnlaugsson (1838–1849)
 Kristján Kristjánsson (1849–1851)
  (1851–1852)
 Vilhjálmur Finsen (1852–1860)
 Hermanníus E. Johnson (1859–1861)
 Árni Thorsteinson (1861–1904)

Faroe Islands

Previously, he received the taxes from the sysselmand and delivered the proceeds to the stiftamtmand of the Faroe Islands.

References

Economic history of Denmark
Economic history of Iceland